The Public Schools of Calumet-Laurium-Keweenaw is located in Calumet, Michigan. The district is Michigan's northernmost K-12 school district.

History 

In 1867, about 25 years after copper was found in the area, the company Calumet and Hecla Mining Company decided to establish a school in the area. The first building was completed in 1876, known as Washington School. The building held students from grades 6-12. In January 1929, the middle school burned down (cause unknown) and was rebuilt in the same year. In the year 1970, a multipurpose building was erected, housing a lunchroom/gym, kitchen, and band hall. In 1997, an elementary school along with an interconnect was built, connecting all three buildings. In the year 2012, a Commons area was added next to the gymnasium and a two-story addition was built onto the elementary school.A new gymnasium was added to the elementary school in 2020.

Attendance boundary
Within Houghton County, the district includes Calumet, Copper City, and Laurium. The district includes the majority of Calumet Township, much of Osceola Township, and a section of Schoolcraft Township.

Within Keweenaw County, the district includes Ahmeek, Eagle Harbor, Eagle River, Fulton, Mohawk. Townships include Allouez Township, Eagle Harbor Township, and Houghton Township.

Demographics 

The Demographic breakdown of the 1,225 students enrolled for the 2016-2017 school year was:

• Male = 44.1%

• Female = 55.9%

• White = 93.5%

• African American = 0.3%

• American Indian/Alaskan Native = 0.3%

• Multiracial = 5.7%

• Hispanic/Latino = 1.6%

• Not Hispanic/Latino = 98.4%

References 

School districts in Michigan
School districts established in 1867
1867 establishments in Michigan
Education in Houghton County, Michigan
Keweenaw County, Michigan